A stalker is someone who engages in stalking.

Stalker or S.T.A.L.K.E.R may also refer to:

Transportation
Aeros Stalker, a hang glider
Lockheed Martin Skunk Works Stalker, an electrically powered UAV
APAL Stalker, a Russian jeep-like SUV

Arts and media

Fictional characters
 Stalker (Batman Beyond), a supervillain from the Batman Beyond animated series
 Stalker (comics), a character from a short-lived DC "sword and sorcery" comic
 Stalker (G.I. Joe), a fictional character in the G.I. Joe universe
 Stalker (Gundam), a character from the anime series Mobile Fighter G Gundam

Film
 Stalker (film festival), a Russian film festival focused on human rights 
 Stalker (1979 film), a Soviet science fiction art film directed by Andrei Tarkovsky
 Stalker (2010 film), a British psychological horror film directed by Martin Kemp
 Stalker (2012 film), an Irish psychological thriller directed by Mark O'Connor
 Stalker (2016 film), a Nigerian romantic drama film directed by Moses Inwang

Games
 S.T.A.L.K.E.R., a first-person shooter franchise
 S.T.A.L.K.E.R.: Shadow of Chernobyl, a first-person shooter loosely inspired by 1979 movie Stalker and the novel Roadside Picnic
 S.T.A.L.K.E.R.: Clear Sky, a prequel to S.T.A.L.K.E.R.: Shadow of Chernobyl
 S.T.A.L.K.E.R.: Call of Pripyat, a sequel to S.T.A.L.K.E.R.: Shadow of Chernobyl
 S.T.A.L.K.E.R. 2, the sequel to S.T.A.L.K.E.R.: Shadow of Chernobyl

Music
 Stalker (album), a 1995 dark ambient album by Lustmord & Robert Rich, inspired by the Tarkovsky film
 "Stalker", a song by Aphrodite from his album Aphrodite
 "Stalker", a song by Audiovent from their album Dirty Sexy Knights in Paris
 "Stalker", a song by Bruno Sutter from his album Bruno Sutter
 "Stalker", a song by Cascada from their album Original Me
 "Stalker", a song by Goldfinger from their album Disconnection Notice
 "Stalker", a song by Recoil from their album Unsound Methods
 "The Stalker", a song by the Insane Clown Posse from their EP Beverly Kills 50187

Print
 Stalker (novel), a novel partly based on the Russian novel Roadside Picnic
 Stalkers (comics), a 1990s comics limited series

Television
 Stalker (TV series), a 2014 TV series starring Maggie Q and Dylan McDermott
 "Stalker" (CSI), an episode of the American television series CSI

People
 Stalker (surname), several people
 The Stalker, the ring name for professional wrestler Barry Windham

Other uses
 Stalker (horse)

See also
 Stalk (disambiguation)
 Deer stalking, a British term for the stealthy hunting of deer without hounds or horses
 Chernobyl stalking, making illegal visits to the Chernobyl nuclear disaster site
 Stalked: Murder in Slow Motion, a 2019 British crime documentary narrated by Kym Marsh